Gola is a sporting goods brand based in England. It was founded on 22 May 1905. It used to be known as the Bozeat Boot Company, and was based in the Northamptonshire village of Bozeat.  Gola was purchased by the Jacobson Group and has since expanded its range.

The company produces mainly track suits and trainers, of which the models known as  "Harrier" and "Chase" are particularly popular, especially in continental Europe. During the 1970s, Gola's licensing was held under Electronic Rentals Group and its principal chairman, Maurice Fry and Leisure Group Managing Director Alan Christopher Cowell who also ran Camping Gaz. ERG PLC pushed several million pounds into Gola and developed the Gola Bag of 1972 which created an international craze.

Recently, in the early 2000s, Gola sportswear was re-launched in the UK as a 'retro' sports fashion brand, selling to the same people, now grown up, who fondly remembered the brand from their childhood – but at premium prices.

Gola sponsored the Alliance Premier League, the highest level of English non-League football, from 1984 until 1986, during which time the league was known as the Gola League.

References

External links
 Official website

Sportswear brands
Shoe companies of the United Kingdom
Sporting goods manufacturers of the United Kingdom
English brands
Manufacturing companies established in 1905
1905 establishments in England
Manufacturing companies of England
Companies based in Lancashire